Oswald the Lucky Rabbit (also known as Oswald the Rabbit or Oswald Rabbit) is an animated cartoon character created in 1927 by Walt Disney and Ub Iwerks for Universal Pictures. He starred in several animated short films released to theaters from 1927 to 1938. Twenty-seven animated Oswald shorts were produced at the Walt Disney Studio. As of January 1, 2023, several of the original Oswald shorts are in the public domain.

After the control of Oswald's character was taken in 1928, Walt created a new character similar in appearance to Oswald as a replacement; Mickey Mouse, who went on to become one of the most famous cartoon characters in the world.

In 2003, Buena Vista Games pitched a concept for an Oswald-themed video game to then-Disney President and future-CEO Bob Iger, who became committed to acquiring the rights to Oswald. In 2006, The Walt Disney Company acquired the trademark of Oswald (with NBCUniversal effectively trading Oswald for the services of Al Michaels as play-by-play announcer on NBC Sunday Night Football). 

Oswald returned in Disney's 2010 video game, Epic Mickey. The game's metafiction plot parallels Oswald's real-world history, dealing with the character's feelings of abandonment by Disney and envy towards Mickey Mouse. He has since appeared in Disney theme parks and comic books, as well as two follow-up games, Epic Mickey 2: The Power of Two and Epic Mickey: Power of Illusion. Oswald made his first appearance in an animated production in 85 years through his cameo appearance in the 2013 animated short Get a Horse!. He was the subject of the 2015 feature film Walt Before Mickey. Oswald also appears as a townsperson in Disney Infinity 2.0. In 2022, Oswald appeared in a brand new short produced by Disney.

Characteristics 
While under Disney's creative control, Oswald was one of the first cartoon characters that had personality. As outlined by Walt himself: "Hereafter we will aim to [make] Oswald a younger character, peppy, alert, saucy and venturesome, keeping him also neat and trim." With Oswald, Disney began to explore the concept of "personality animation", in which cartoon characters were defined as individuals through their movements, mannerisms and acting, instead of simply through their design. Around this period, Disney had expressed, "I want the characters to be somebody. I don't want them just to be a drawing." Not only were gags used, but his humor differed in terms of what he used to make people laugh. He presented physical humor, used situations to his advantage, presented situational humor in general and frustration comedy best shown in the cartoon The Mechanical Cow. He would make use of animal limbs to solve problems and even use his own limbs as props and gags. He could be squished as if he was made of rubber and could turn anything into tools. His distinct personality was inspired by Douglas Fairbanks for his courageous and adventurous attitude as seen in the cartoon short Oh, What a Knight.

In regards to Oswald's personality, Disney historian David Gerstein describes the difference between Mickey and Oswald: "Imagine Mickey if he were a little more egotistical or fallible, or imagine Bugs Bunny if he talked the talk but wasn't as good at walking the walk."

In order to make his Oswald cartoons look "real", Disney turned away from the styles of Felix the Cat, Koko the Clown, Krazy Kat and Julius the Cat and began emulating the camera angles, effects and editing of live-action films. To learn how to base gags on personality and how to build comic routines, rather than heaping one gag after another, he studied Laurel and Hardy, Harold Lloyd, Charlie Chaplin and Buster Keaton. In order to stir emotion in an audience, Disney studied and scrutinized the shadow effects, cross-cutting and staging of action in films featuring Douglas Fairbanks and Lon Chaney.

Walt Disney did not want for Oswald to simply be "a rabbit character animated and shown in the same light as the commonly known cat characters", as well as merely just a peg for gags. Instead, his stated intention was "to make Oswald peculiarly and typically OSWALD."

History

Creation 

In 1927, because of cost and technical restrictions, Disney and his chief animator Ub Iwerks decided to end their work on the Alice Comedies and Julius the Cat. Around the same time, in January 1927, Charles Mintz got word that Universal Pictures wanted to get into the cartoon business, so he told Disney to create a new rabbit character he could sell to Universal, since there were too much cat characters (Krazy Kat, Felix the Cat, etc.). After Oswald was created, Winkler signed a contract with Universal on March 4, 1927, that would guarantee 26 Oswald the Lucky Rabbit cartoons. Work on both the character and series began soon after Disney moved his studio to Hyperion Avenue.

Disney chose to make the character a rabbit since there were already two popular animated cats at the time, Felix the Cat and Krazy Kat.

The first Oswald cartoon, Poor Papa, was rejected by the Universal studio heads for its poor production quality and the sloppiness and age of Oswald. Disney, together with Iwerks, decided to create a second cartoon titled Trolley Troubles featuring a much younger, neater Oswald. The short, released on September 5, 1927, officially launched the series and proved to be Universal's greatest success to date. Poor Papa was later released in 1928 and the storyline was reused in a Mickey Mouse short five years later, in Mickey's Nightmare. Oswald the Lucky Rabbit became Universal's first major hit in 1927, rivaling other popular cartoon characters, such as Felix the Cat and Koko the Clown.

The success of the Oswald series allowed the Walt Disney Studio to grow to a staff of nearly twenty. Walt's weekly salary from the series was $100 while Roy Disney's was $65. The Disney brothers earned $500 per Oswald short and split the year-end profits, with Walt receiving 60% ($5,361), and Roy receiving 40% ($3,574). With income gained from the Oswald series, Walt and Roy purchased ten acres of land in the desert. They also invested in an oil-drilling venture. Iwerks also invested his income in several stone mills to crush paint pigment he used to make paint formulas that were utilized by animators for decades.

Oswald's success also resulted in Universal and Winkler signing another contract in February 1928, guaranteeing three more years of Oswald cartoons.

As time passed, Disney feared that Mintz would forgo renewal of the contract, partly due to Iwerks informing Disney that George Winkler, at the behest of Mintz, had been going behind Disney's back during pick-up runs for Oswald reels and hiring away his animators. Eventually, Walt traveled with his wife Lilly to New York to find other potential distributors for his studio's cartoons, including Fox and MGM, prior to meetings with Mintz. As Walt later recalled, he placed two Oswald prints under one arm and—feeling "like a hick"—marched "one half-block north" on Broadway to MGM to visit Fred Quimby. During this period, Walt and Lillian attended the premier of the Oswald short Rival Romeos, which debuted at the Colony on 53rd and Broadway.

In February 1928, Disney traveled to New York City in hopes of negotiating a more profitable contract with his producer Charles Mintz. But as economic problems were apparent at the time, Mintz figured Disney should settle for a 20% cut, although large turnarounds were promised if the studio's finances showed considerable growth. While most of his fellow animators left for Mintz's studio, Disney decided to quit working on the Oswald cartoons. On his long train ride home, he came up with an idea to create another character, and retain the rights to it. He and Iwerks would go on to develop a new cartoon in secret, starring a new character which would soon become the most successful cartoon character in film history and later became the foundation of a global entertainment empire. The first Mickey Mouse cartoon to be filmed was Plane Crazy in the summer of 1928, but it was produced as a silent and held back from release. The first Mickey Mouse film with a synchronized soundtrack, Steamboat Willie, reached the screen that fall and became a major hit, eclipsing Oswald. Plane Crazy was later given its own synchronized soundtrack and released on March 17, 1929.

Universal takes direct control 

Mintz, meanwhile, opened his own studio (later known as Screen Gems) consisting primarily of former Disney employees, where he continued to produce Oswald cartoons, among them the first Oswald with sound, Hen Fruit (1929). Coincidentally, Disney and Mintz each produced nine cartoons the first year and 17 the next, before Oswald was taken over by others. Animators Hugh Harman and Rudolf Ising, unhappy with Mintz, asked Universal head Carl Laemmle to remove Mintz, suggesting they would be the ones to continue the Oswald series. Laemmle did terminate Mintz's contract, but instead of hiring Harman and Ising, he opted to have the Oswald cartoons produced right on the Universal lot. Laemmle selected Walter Lantz to produce the new series of Oswald shorts (the first of which was 1929's Race Riot).
Over the next decade, Lantz produced 142 Oswald cartoons, for a total of 194 films featuring the character, spanning the work of all three producers. After Lantz took over production in 1929, the character's look was changed to some degree over the following years: Oswald got white gloves on his hands, shoes on his feet, a shirt, a "cuter" face with larger eyes, a bigger head, and shorter ears. With 1935's Case of the Lost Sheep, an even more major makeover took place: the character was drawn more realistically now, with white fur rather than black, shoes are removed, plus wearing suspenders instead of a shirt and shorts. Both redesigns were done by Manuel Moreno, who recalled that in the 1935 redesign that Lantz said to make Oswald cute and to get rid of the black on him, because Disney was also changing his characters.

The cartoons containing the new, white-furred Oswald seemed to be different from their predecessors in more than one way, as the stories themselves became softer. Minor changes in the drawing style would continue, too. With Happy Scouts (1938), the second-to-last Oswald film produced, the rabbit's fur went from being all-white to a combination of white and gray.

Unlike the Disney shorts, in which Oswald did not speak, Lantz's cartoons began to feature actual dialogue for Oswald, although most of the cartoons were still silent to begin with. Animator Bill Nolan performed the voice of Oswald in Cold Turkey, the first Lantz cartoon with dialogue, and the following year Pinto Colvig, who was working as an animator and gag man at the studio, started voicing Oswald. When Colvig left the studio in 1931, Mickey Rooney took over the voicing of Oswald until early in the following year. Starting in 1932, Lantz ceased to use a regular voice actor for Oswald, and many studio staff members (including Lantz himself) would take turns in voicing the character over the years. June Foray provided Oswald's voice in The Egg Cracker Suite, which was the final theatrical short to feature the character. She later voiced him again for an unaired radio pilot, Sally in Hollywoodland (1947).

Oswald made a cameo appearance in the first animated sequence with both sound and color (two-strip Technicolor), a 2½-minute animated sequence of the live action movie The King of Jazz (1930), produced by Laemmle for Universal. However, it was not until 1934 that Oswald got his own color sound cartoons in two-strip Technicolor, Toyland Premiere and Springtime Serenade. The Oswald cartoons then returned to black-and-white, except for the last one, The Egg Cracker Suite (1943), released as a part of the Swing Symphonies series. Egg Cracker was also the only Oswald cartoon to use three-strip Technicolor. Oswald's last cartoon appearance was a cameo in The Woody Woodpecker Polka (1951), also in Technicolor, which by then had become the norm in the cartoon industry. He also appeared in a 1952 theatrical commercial for the Electric Autolite Company, with his voice being provided by Dick Beals.

Comic books 

Oswald's first appearance in comics was in a series of comic strips titled Oswald the Rabbit, which ran from February 1935 to January 1936. They were drawn by Al Stahl and published by National Allied Publications. The comics were serialized on one page of the entirety of New Fun and the first issue of More Fun.

Oswald's second run in comics began in Dell Comics' New Funnies, which ran from 1942 to 1962. Following the typical development seen in most new comics, the New Funnies stories slowly morphed the character in their own direction.

At the start of the New Funnies feature, Oswald existed in a milieu reminiscent of Winnie-the-Pooh: he was portrayed as a live stuffed animal, living in a forest together with other anthropomorphized toys. These included Toby Bear, Maggie Lou the wooden doll, Hi-Yah Wahoo the turtle-faced Indian, and Woody Woodpecker—depicted as a mechanical doll filled with nuts and bolts (hence his "nutty" behavior). In 1944, with the addition of writer John Stanley, the stuffed animal motif was dropped, as were Maggie Lou, Woody, and Wahoo. Oswald and Toby became flesh and blood characters living as roommates in "Lantzville". Initially drawn by Dan Gormley, the series was later drawn by the likes of Dan Noonan and Lloyd White.

In 1948, Toby adopted two orphan rabbits for Oswald to raise. Floyd and Lloyd, "Poppa Oswald's" new sons, stuck around; Toby was relegated to the sidelines, disappearing for good in 1953. Later stories focused on Oswald adventuring with his sons, seeking odd jobs, or simply protecting the boys from the likes of rabbit-eating Reddy Fox and (from 1961) con man Gabby Gator—a character adapted from contemporary Woody Woodpecker cartoon shorts. This era of Oswald comics typically featured the art of Jack Bradbury, known also for his Mickey Mouse work.

After the assassination of John F. Kennedy, with the publishers not liking the name of the rabbit anymore, Oswald comics tended to be produced outside the United States, for example in Mexico, Italy, and Japan.

He made brief appearances in the Woody Woodpecker comics series until it ended in the 1970s. Through the end of the 20th century, the foreign comics carried on the look and story style of the Dell Oswald stories. 

In 2010, Oswald starred in the digi-comic series Epic Mickey: Tales of the Wasteland, a prequel to the Epic Mickey video game, sharing what the Wasteland was like before Mickey arrived there.

In 2011, Oswald starred in the Norwegian Disney comic story "En magisk jul!", written by David Gerstein and drawn by Mark Kausler. It is based on and takes place in the times of the classic Oswald shorts from 1927–28. The story was later reprinted, as "Just Like Magic!", in the American Disney comic Walt Disney's Comics and Stories #726 (2015).

Disney acquires Oswald trademark 

In February 2006, Disney CEO Bob Iger initiated a trade with NBC Universal in which a number of minor assets, including the rights to Oswald and the 27 shorts that Walt Disney had worked on, were acquired by The Walt Disney Company in exchange for sending sportscaster Al Michaels from Disney's ABC and ESPN to NBC Sports. At the time, ABC had lost its contract for NFL broadcast rights, and despite recently signing a long-term contract with ESPN, Michaels was interested in rejoining broadcast partner John Madden at NBC for the Sunday night package. Universal transferred the trademark of the character to Disney, and in exchange, Disney released Michaels from his employment contract, allowing him to sign with NBC. 

The deal included the trademark rights to the character and the 27 Disney-produced Oswald shorts along with the handover of any physical Disney-produced Oswald material Universal still had in their possession. Iger had been interested in the property because of an internal design document for a video game, which became Epic Mickey. Walt Disney's daughter, Diane Disney Miller, issued the following statement after the deal was announced:

Around the same time, the Kansas City Chiefs and New York Jets made a similar deal, the Chiefs giving the Jets a draft pick as compensation for releasing coach Herm Edwards from his contract. Referring to this trade, Michaels said:

In January 2007, a T-shirt line from Comme des Garçons seems to have constituted the first new Disney Oswald merchandise. Following in December was a two-disc DVD set, The Adventures of Oswald the Lucky Rabbit, included in Wave Seven of the Walt Disney Treasures DVD series. Several Oswald collectors' figurines and a limited edition grayscale plush toy appeared shortly after the DVD set's release. The Disney Store also began to introduce Oswald into its merchandise lines, starting with a canvas print and Christmas ornament that became available Fall 2007. A standard-issue color plush toy matching Oswald's appearance in Epic Mickey appeared in late 2010. This was followed by an ongoing roll-out of clothing and other products at the Disney Store, various chain stores, and the Disney California Adventure theme park.

In 2012, the newly-redesigned Buena Vista Street at Disney California Adventure included Oswald's Filling Station, an Oswald merchandise stand themed as a 1920s Gas Station. The shop exclusively only sells just "Oswald the Lucky Rabbit" merchandise such as "Oswald Ears" hats (a similar style to the popular Mickey Mouse Club black mouse eared caps), as well as shirts, t-shirts, plush toys, pins, mugs among other special Oswald items. In 2014, Oswald began making appearances in the area near the shop.

Video games 
In 1995, Oswald briefly appeared in Férias Frustradas do Pica-Pau, a Woody Woodpecker video game released for the Sega Master System and the Mega Drive in Brazil only.

Oswald is one of the main characters in the video game franchise Epic Mickey. The world of Epic Mickey is called "Wasteland" and it is similar to Disneyland but for "forgotten" Disney characters, including Oswald, who rules the place. Actually, Oswald fashioned it after Disneyland, but he put images of himself in the place of Mickey in the statue with Walt Disney and other places throughout the town. Oswald was the first cartoon character to be "forgotten" and inhabit Wasteland. Oswald dislikes Mickey for stealing his popularity that he felt he deserved. Oswald tries to make Wasteland a better place for forgotten characters, especially his "bunny children" and his wife Ortensia.

Epic Mickey 2: The Power of Two is a video game that was released on November 18, 2012. Unlike the previous game, Epic Mickey 2 features full voiced cut-scenes with Frank Welker (Welker had also provided Oswald's vocal effects in the previous game) as Oswald's first voice actor in an Oswald the Lucky Rabbit production from Disney. (Bill Nolan was Oswald's first voice actor in 1929, when Walter Lantz produced the Oswald cartoons.)

Tetsuya Nomura, creator and lead producer of the Kingdom Hearts franchise, had requested for Oswald's use in Kingdom Hearts III, but the response from Disney was that the character would be "too difficult" to use, with no further clarification or details from Disney. Nomura cites Oswald as one of his favorite Disney characters.

Disney projects 
In 2012, sketch animation from a lost 1928 cartoon, Harem Scarem, was compiled by archivists at Disney and released to help celebrate Oswald's 85th Anniversary. He made an appearance in a 2013 throwback style Mickey Mouse cartoon, Get a Horse!

While only 19 of 26 cartoons were previously known to have survived, a couple of Oswald's lost cartoons were found in the 2010s. In 2015, the British Film Institute's National Archives were found to hold his Sleigh Bells (1927) footage. The BFI and Walt Disney Animation Studios worked to restore the short. Long-term Disney animator David Bossert wrote a book, Oswald the Lucky Rabbit: The Search for the Lost Disney Cartoons which was released in 2017. A Japanese man, Yasushi Watanabe, read the book and discovered that he had a missing 1928 Oswald cartoon, Neck & Neck, since he was a teenager.

A series centered on Oswald was in development with the project announced in 2019 for a potential release on Disney+. Disney Television Animation veteran Matt Danner revealed that a series was in development as a follow up for the team behind Legend of the Three Caballeros, but that they "got broken up and scattered to the wind." He expressed hope that the series could still be revived in the future and further hinted that another team would develop it as Disney was still heavily invested in wanting to revive the character.

On December 1, 2022, an online hand-drawn animated Oswald short by Walt Disney Animation Studios was released. The short was directed by Eric Goldberg, scored by Dean McClure, and produced by Dorothy McKim, with Mark Henn and Randy Haycock working on the animation alongside Goldberg. It marked Oswald's first short produced by Disney, as well as his last short ever since Feed the Kitty (1938). A few weeks later, a hand-drawn animation piece by Disney Animation featuring Oswald was released, meant to promote a line of products developed by Disney and Givenchy.

Merchandise 
Shortly after the rabbit starred in his black and white animated silent shorts between 1927 and 1928, he was successfully able to sell merchandise for Universal: a chocolate-covered marshmallow candy bar, a stencil set, and a pin-backed button. In 2004 and 2005, Oswald products became popular in Japan and were primarily made available as prizes in UFO catchers and as official merchandise in Universal Studios Japan, manufactured by Taito and/or Medicom, these products included puppets, inflatable dolls, keyrings, and watches Oswald made his first Disneyland appearance at Tokyo Disneyland on March 31, 2010, as an Easter float. At the Magic Kingdom in Walt Disney World, a poster of Oswald can be seen at the Town Square Theater where Mickey Mouse is available for meet and greets. Also inside Mickey's meeting area, a doodle of Oswald and Mickey can be seen. Clothing products are also available at Disneyland Paris in Walt Disney Studios Park. As of October 4, 2017, Oswald now has a Service Station at Disney's California Adventure (Near the entrance.) that only sells exclusive "Oswald The Lucky Rabbit" merchandise including Oswald ears, hats (baseball caps), shirts, t-shirts, plates, coats, cups, mugs, plush toys, key-chains and much more.

Theme park appearances 
The Oswald character showed up at the parks in Florida and California on the day Disney reacquired Oswald, but made no further appearances at the time.

In 2010, Tokyo Disneyland produced a float featuring Oswald for their first Easter holiday event.

In 2011, Oswald appeared with other old Disney characters on the Construction walls for Disney California Adventure Park's new entrance.

In 2011, Oswald appeared on a poster as a magician's rabbit in Town Square Theater in Magic Kingdom park.

In 2011, Oswald appeared on various items of clothing available for purchase at Disneyland Paris in the shops on Main Street USA.

In 2012, Disney California Adventure park at the Disneyland Resort reopened with a new entry area called Buena Vista Street, themed to 1920s Los Angeles. Oswald's Service Station is a 1920s gas station (housing a gift shop) located at the north end of the street and features Oswald prominently in its logo. Disney California Adventure also sells Oswald merchandise, while next door Disneyland Park offers Mickey Mouse merchandise exclusively.

In 2012, Oswald ear hats appeared at the Emporium at Walt Disney World in Florida.

As of May 28, 2014, Oswald can be spotted on the exit of The Seven Dwarves ride at Magic Kingdom, Orlando. He is carved into a tree near the exit door.

On April 1, 2014, a new Oswald costumed character began meet-and-greets at Tokyo DisneySea.

On September 14, 2014, Oswald began making appearances on Buena Vista Street at Disney California Adventure.

As of October 4, 2017, Oswald now has a Service Station at Disney California Adventure and has been spotted making appearances.

On June 2, 2018 at the FanDaze event Oswald's spouse, Ortensia accompanied him as a VIP guest In Disneyland Paris. They also performed in the show, "Oh My, Ortensia".

Oswald was featured on the medal of the Walt Disney World Marathon Weekend 10K. The event took place on January 7, 2022 as part of runDisney's WDW Marathon Weekend.

On 12 September 2022, Hong Kong Disneyland announces the premier of activities of 2023. As part of the celebration for 100th anniversary of Walt Disney Company, Oswald would appear as a special guest from 2023, making himself as a debut for Hong Kong Disneyland. Oswald appears for the first time on 13 January 2023, in the 2023 Hong Kong Disneyland Fanfest and start meet & greet with annual pass holders from 18 January to 27 February, followed by meeting all guests from 1 March 2023 onwards.

From January 20 to February 15th, 2023 at Disney California Adventure, Oswald and his wife Ortenisa appeared to celebrate Chinese New Year, which marks Ortensia's debut in a U.S. theme park.

Filmography

Home media 
 In the 1940s and 1950s, Oswald titles could still be found in 16mm and 8mm film catalogs.
 Some earlier Oswald shorts are in the public domain, and have thus been available for some years in various lower-quality video and DVD compilations. Some are lost.
 An attempted restoration of the then surviving Disney Oswald shorts, under the title The Adventures of Oswald the Lucky Rabbit, appeared as a two-disc volume in Walt Disney Treasures: Wave Seven, released December 11, 2007. The cartoons included Ozzie of the Mounted, Tall Timber, and a much-extended version of Bright Lights, all newly rediscovered at the time.
 Six Walter Lantz Oswald cartoons, including Hells Heels and Toyland Premiere, have been included in The Woody Woodpecker and Friends Classic Cartoon Collection DVD.
 Five additional Lantz Oswald shorts, including Wax Works and Springtime Serenade, are included in The Woody Woodpecker and Friends Classic Cartoon Collection: Volume 2 DVD.
 The full version of Oh, What a Knight is included as an unlockable cartoon in Epic Mickey by collecting various film reels in the game.
 The restored version of Hungry Hoboes is included as part of the bonus features in the release of the Walt Disney Signature Collection edition of Snow White and the Seven Dwarfs on Blu-ray. Although the short is not included on the disc itself, a digital code is included with the Blu-ray so the short can be "unlocked" for viewing.
 The shorts My Pal Paul and Africa are fully restored and included as extras in the Criterion release of King of Jazz.
 The short Poor Papa was restored and included as an extra in the Walt Disney Signature Collection edition of Pinocchio.

Reception 
During the 1920s, the Oswald shorts, as well as Oswald himself, proved extremely popular and had received substantial critical acclaim. The Film Daily noted that the series was "one of the best sellers of the 'U[niversal]' short subject program." According to The Moving Picture World, Oswald had "accomplished the astounding feat of jumping into the first-run favor overnight".

With the release of Trolley Troubles, The Film Daily wrote, "As conductor on a 'Toonerville' trolley, Oswald is a riot. This ... you can book on pure faith, and our solemn word that they have the goods."

The Moving Picture World noted Oswald was "good for a lot of smiles and real laughs. 'Trolley Troubles' presents Oswald as the skipper of a dinky little trolley on a wild ride over mountains."

According to The Moving Picture World:

With the release of Oh, Teacher, Moving Picture World wrote that it "lives up to the promise of the first ... as a clever, peppy, and amusing series of cartoons that should prove popular in any type of house. This one deals with Oswald as a school kid and introduces a cat as his rival. It contains some of the best gags we have seen in cartoons."

With the release of The Mechanical Cow, Moving Picture World wrote that Oswald "has a wild and amusing time with his ingenuous milk producer".

With the release of Great Guns, Moving Picture World wrote that Oswald is a "hero in action in the trenches and [in] a situation where two planes fight each other like pugilists". They found that Great Guns was "chock full of humor" and wrote, "This series is bound to be popular in all types of houses if the present standard is maintained."

Moving Picture World also wrote of the series:

In addition:

In the modern era, animation historian David Gerstein notes:

Oswald won Best New Character in both Readers' Choice and Editors' Choice in Nintendo Power's Best of 2010 awards.

Tetsuya Nomura, creator and lead producer of the Kingdom Hearts franchise, lists Oswald as one of his favorite Disney characters.

See also 
 Animation in the United States during the silent era
 Golden age of American animation

References

External links 
 
 
 Oswald the Lukcy Rabbit at Don Markstein's Toonopedia. Archived from the original on September 7, 2015.
 Oswald the Lucky Rabbit Theatrical Series -M. J. Winkler Prods at the Big Cartoon DataBase
 Of Rocks and Socks: The Winkler Oswalds (1928–29)
 The Walter Lantz Cartune Encyclopedia: Cartune Profiles: Oswald the Lucky Rabbit
 Oswald the Lucky Rabbit on IMDb
 Lost Disney film found in the BFI National Archive

 
Anthropomorphic rabbits and hares
Film characters introduced in 1927
Film series introduced in 1927
Male characters in animation
Disney core universe characters
Walt Disney Studios (division) franchises
Animated film series
Fictional inventors
Fictional rabbits and hares
Fictional anthropomorphic characters
Universal Pictures cartoons and characters
Woody Woodpecker
Video game bosses
Disney short film series
Walter Lantz Productions cartoons and characters
Screen_Gems_film_series
Animated characters introduced in 1927